The Como–Lecco railway is a railway line in Lombardy, Italy.

The railway line was opened on 20 November 1888.

References

Footnotes

Sources

See also 
 List of railway lines in Italy

Railway lines in Lombardy
Railway lines opened in 1888